San Juan is a district of the Abangares canton, in the Guanacaste province of Costa Rica.

Geography 
San Juan has an area of  km² and an elevation of  metres.

Villages
Administrative center of the district is the village of San Juan Grande.

Other villages are Arizona, Congo, Nancital, Portones, Pozo Azul Rancho Alegre (partly), Rancho Ania (partly), Tierra Colorada and Vainilla.

Demographics 

Transportation

Road transportation 
The district is covered by the following road routes:
 National Route 1

References 

Districts of Guanacaste Province
Populated places in Guanacaste Province